Parchhaven is an Indian Punjabi-language television show produced by Jalandhar Doordarshan in 1996. It depicts the agony and lifelong repentance of a young man whose lust and cowardice lead to the death of his innocent beloved.

Plot summary 
Bulara (Gurpreet Ghuggi) is the young son of a haughty land owner Ratta (B.N. Sharma) and a cruel mother Melo (Jasdeep Kaur). His elder brother Charna (Raj Kumar Arora) is a weak person. Bulara's childless sister-in-law Debo (Neena Cheema) treats him like her own son.

Bulara's elder sister Kaki (Sukhwinder Grewal) falls for the young athlete Kangan (Krishan Arora) who lives in the neighborhood and is a friend, philosopher, and guide for Bulara. The upright person leaves the village as a reaction to Kaki's advances.

Bulara is now a lonely directionless person and seduces the gypsy girl Naini (Amarjeet). He becomes aware that she died after becoming pregnant with his child and runs away to a temple to his childhood friend Bhikhu (Pramod Kalia). Ratta suppresses the case by bribing the police inspector. He stays at a temple for some time and then leaves on an endless journey as an ascetic.

Debo remains childless and had always been ill-treated by her in-laws. She is forsaken when she has to leave the home of her in-laws when her husband marries another girl (Jeeto) who is rude. Instigated by Jeeto, Melo and Ratta even accuse Debo of having an affair with Bulara, after which Debo leaves her in-laws house and goes to her parents with Bulara. She only comes back when village elders request her to come back to her in-laws fearing that she may file a case against Charna for bigamy. Ratta learns that his daughter Kaki has gone astray, has a heart attack, and becomes paralyzed. He dies as a repentant man after seeking forgiveness from Debo. Years pass by and Melo's grandsons force her to leave her own home and she dies in Debo's arms.

Time takes a leap and Debo becomes almost blind. Bulara comes to meet Debo after many years and makes a commitment to fulfill Debo's desire of building an Eye Hospital in the village. Bulara and Debo decide to sell off their share of the property to gather money for the hospital which does not go well with Jeeto and her sons who try to get Bulara and Debo killed. Bulara and Debo are saved by Bulara's old friend Gamchcha and other villagers who catch the contract killers. Although Bulara knows who had sent the killers for him, he decides not to press any charges against Jeeto's sons. Bulara keeps gathering donations from pilgrims and is able to collect a large sum. One night Bulara is shot by a terrorist who had come to steal the donation money, which, as a matter of coincidence, is Kangan. Bulara is confused that how come his mentor and a rightful man like Kangan has become a terrorist. Kangan tries to revive Bulara at this den for few days but his health deteriorates at Kangan's den and his last wish is to visit his village to see Debo. Bulara is taken by Kangan and his gang to his village where he lays the foundation stone of the hospital and dies in Debo's arms.

Credits 
The 18 episodes serial was produced and directed by Ravi Deep who also wrote its screenplay. This serial was based on a Punjabi novel Bujh Rahi Batti Da Chanan written by Om Parkash Gasso. The title song written by Inderjit Hasanpuri was composed and sung by Maqbool Bali. One of the songs in the serial was penned by Gurpreet Ghuggi and sung by Rajinder Malhar. Another song written by Hasanpuri was sung by Hans Raj Hans.

Cast 
Gurpreet Ghuggi as Bulara

Amarjit Kaur as Naini

Neena Cheema as Debo

Pramod Kalia as Bhikhu

Raj Kumar Arora as Charna

B.N. Sharma as Ratta

Jasdeep Kaur as Melo

Sukhwinder Grewal as Kaki

Gurmukh Singh Ghumman as Ranjit

Rajinder Kashyap as Tichhana

Prem Kakaria as Lekhu

Janak Bagga as Chando

Hem Raj Sharma as Nambardar

Varanjit as Naini's Father

Veena Vij as Naini's Mother

Pinkish as Jeeto Charna's second wife

Goverdhan Godhi as Police Inspector

Sumandeep as child Bulara

Samir Sharda as child Bhikhu

Raj Sahni as Vaid

B.K. Shamim as Sadhu

Harjinder as Sadhu

Book 
The novel Bujh Rahi Batti Da Chanan was republished under the title Parchhaven along with information about the serial and its photographs. Director, lyricist and artists of the serial share their thoughts with the readers of this book.

References

External links 
 
 

Indian television series
1996 Indian television series debuts
Television shows set in Punjab, India
DD Punjabi original programming
Sikhism in fiction
Punjabi-language television shows